Local Public Planning Councils, Local Councils of Public Planning or Consejos Locales de Planificación Pública (CLPP), are institutions of local government in Venezuela as enacted by the 1999 constitution of Venezuela. They are a subdivision of municipal government that is unitary. The 335 municipalities in the country are divided into 1,084 civil parishes. They serve as functions for community control of local services and resources. Due to government functioning on a majority basis, the coalitions that this entails have hindered effective functioning of the process.

History

Colonial Venezuela led to the establishment of the 23 states of Venezuela out of the colonial provinces. Since independence in 1821, a variety of states have been merged, culminating in an expansion by three states in the late 1990s. The Federal War of 1859-1863 between the conservatives and liberals led to federalism and hindered devolution as a result of the ensuing caudillismo. A 1969 presidential decree led to the grouping of the states into 10 administrative regions and further consolidated the federal government's authority.

In addition to Venezuela under Hugo Chavez, Brazil's Lula da Silva has also cited the need for change to the elite-dominated system by highlighting an interrelationship between the political and the social fields. In the latter case, this led to "participatory budgeting," which allows for an increase in civil participation of the allocation of local government resources. In Venezuela, however, this involved a further step of providing the tools for civil participation in influencing decisions in regards to daily economic and social welfare as participatory democracy to address social exclusion by increasing accountability and directing more resources to direct representation.

Goals
The idea behind the CLPP is to counter a prevailing systemic poverty that had not changed despite democratisation across the continent. It seeks to maintain a comprehensive civil society mechanism, an active political culture and enhance opportunities for political participation. It also seeks to complement representative democracy with participatory democracy. It intends to be an engine for direct popular participation at the grassroots level.

References 

History of Venezuela
Politics of Venezuela
Political organizations based in Venezuela
Local government